The 1994 Idaho Vandals football team represented the University of Idaho in the 1994 NCAA Division I-AA football season. The Vandals, led by sixth-year head coach John L. Smith, were members of the Big Sky Conference and played their home games at the Kibbie Dome, an indoor facility on campus in Moscow, Idaho.

Led by quarterbacks Eric Hisaw and Brian Brennan, Idaho finished the regular season at 9–2 and 5–2 in the Big Sky, and the Vandals again made the Division I-AA playoffs.

Notable games
After advancing to the semifinals in 1993, Idaho was ranked tenth in the preseason I-AA poll, won their first seven games, and climbed to third in late October. They traveled to Missoula and top-ranked Montana won the Little Brown Stein for the fourth consecutive year. The Grizzlies then lost two in a row to fall to third in the Big Sky standings.

In the regular season finale for the conference title, the Vandals lost to rival Boise State for first time since 1981, as the Broncos won  in Boise.

Division I-AA playoffs
For the ninth time in ten seasons, the Vandals made the 16-team I-AA playoffs and were ranked sixth in the regular season's final poll.

With Boise State and Montana hosting, Idaho was sent on the road in the first round, and they lost  at fifth-ranked McNeese State in Lake Charles, Louisiana. Montana advanced to the semifinals but fell to Youngstown State, who defeated Boise State in the championship game.

Notable players and coaches
Sophomore defensive end Ryan Phillips was a four-year starter; he moved to outside linebacker as a senior in 1996, and was selected in the third round of the 1997 NFL Draft by the New York Giants. He played five seasons in the NFL, including Super Bowl XXXV in January 2001.

Two future Vandal head coaches were on the staff: Nick Holt (defensive coordinator/defensive line) and Paul Petrino (receivers).

This was Smith's final year as head coach at Idaho and his 53 wins leads the Vandals' all-time list; Dennis Erickson is next, with 36 in five seasons.

Schedule

References

External links
Gem of the Mountains: 1995 University of Idaho yearbook – 1994 football season

Idaho
Idaho Vandals football seasons
Idaho Vandals football